Milje can refer to either:

Muggia, or Milje in Slovene, a settlement and a commune of Italy
Milje, Slovenia, a village in the Šenčur municipality in Slovenia
Milje, Trnovo, a village in Bosnia and Herzegovina